Patrycja Wiśniewska (born 12 August 1987) is a Polish football forward.

Honours 
Unia Racibórz
Winner
 Ekstraliga Kobiet (4): 2009–10, 2010–11, 2011–12, 2012–13

External links 
 

1987 births
Living people
Polish women's footballers
Place of birth missing (living people)
Women's association football forwards
Poland women's international footballers
RTP Unia Racibórz players